Rosford Street Reserve, or Rosford Reserve, is an urban park and nature reserve situated in the western suburbs of Sydney, New South Wales, Australia. The reserve contains an open grassland, woodlands and recreational areas surrounded by native plants, such as eucalyptus trees. Janice Crosio Oval is a fenced sports ground incorporated within the reserve. The park is one of the largest in the Fairfield LGA area.

History
Prospect Creek, which winds through the reserve, was an important source of food for the local Aboriginal Australians. The creek contained a number of shell middens, which were also weighty to the natives. After European settlement, in around 1883, the area that was to be Reserve was 11 hectares and was used to grow vegetables up until 1974. The athletics tracks and grandstand were built in the late 1970s and that area was named Janice Crosio Oval in 1995. The Reserve was added to through a series of land acquisitions by the Fairfield City Council by 1987.

Geography
The reserve is fairly flat and is situated in Rosford Street, its namesake, in the northern periphery of Smithfield, with Dublin Street partially intersecting through it, Hassal Street being on the western end, Gipps Road to northwest and Rhondda Street being on the park's southeast entrance. The reserve straddles Prospect Creek, which creates the border between Fairfield City and Cumberland Council. The surrounding area is residential to the south and industrial to the north. The Reserve adjoins Long Street Park to the east and Gipps Road Sporting Complex to the west, which are situated in the Cumberland Council section of Smithfield.

Ecology

Prior to European settlement, the Reserve featured an open forest, woodland and riparian communities. The Reserve contains a riparian forest to the north, a remnant of the Cumberland Plain Woodlands, with Prospect Creek winding through it. 

The vegetation that surrounds the reserve's creekline is within the riparian zone and is dominated by Eucalyptus amplifolia, Eucalyptus moluccana, Eucalyptus baueriana, Eucalyptus fibrosa, Eucalyptus teriticornis, angophora floribunda and Casuarina glauca, which grow 10 to 20 meters, with an understorey of Acacia parramattensis, Bursaria spinosa, Daviesia ulicifolia, Exocarpos cupressiformis, Dillwynia, Indigofera australis and over ten native grass species. Introduced species in the riparian woodland include Passiflora suberosa, Solanum mauritianum, Lantana camara, Senna pendula and Cardiospermum halicacabum, among other species.

The fauna includes Australian birds, such as the Australian raven, Australian magpie and the galah. The bell miner is found deep within the wooded areas of the park and seems to be restricted to those regions. Soils in the Reserve include podsols and alluvial soils.

Features
There is a long cycling and walking track in the park (constructed in 2009-10) which starts from Rhondda Street, at the park's southeast entrance within the prospect of a vast verdant field, and goes through the riparian woodland to the park's north, which leads to other parks in the region. In late 2021, a walking trail was constructed on the western side of the park, which parallels Rosford Street and approaches Gipps Road to the east and leads to the gallery forest in the park's northwest, connecting to the track that starts from Rhondda Street.

The park includes a baseball diamond, children's playground and picnic tables, with an avenue planted trees along Rosford Street and a row of logs to give the reserve an aesthetic perspective. The Janice Crosio Oval, which is floodlit and irrigated, provides shared facilities for rugby league, soccer, cricket and athletics. A grandstand with spectator seating and an amenities block are also featured.

See also
Fairfield Park Precinct
Wetherill Park Nature Reserve
Western Sydney Regional Park
Brenan Park
Prospect Nature Reserve

References

Parks in Sydney
Nature reserves in Sydney
Forests of New South Wales
Urban forests
Remnant urban bushland